Mary Talbot (November 30, 1903 – April 16, 1990) was an American entomologist and zoologist known for her studies of the ecology and behavior of ants. She was a Professor and Chair of Biology at Lindenwood College. She completed her PhD at the University of Chicago under Alfred E. Emerson and studied ants for more than fifty years, predominantly in the Edwin S. George Reserve at the University of Michigan.

Talbot produced dozens of papers about her work on ants that laid the foundation for research exploring important questions in population and community ecology, behavior, and natural history. She identified 90 species of ants in Chicago. In 1951, she started a 26-year research project to study and document populations of ants within the Edwin S. George Reserve. She is commemorated in the scientific names of the ant species Formica talbotae and Monomorium talbotae.

References

External links

Talbot, Mary (1903–1990) at AntWiki

American entomologists
Myrmecologists
1903 births
1990 deaths
Women entomologists
University of Chicago alumni
Lindenwood University people
20th-century American zoologists
20th-century American women scientists
University of Michigan people